Robert John Sayers (27 January 1845 – 12 May 1919) was an English-born Australian politician. Born at Cowes, on the Isle of Wight, he was educated in England before migrating to Australia in 1863. He was a goldminer in New South Wales and then Queensland, and became a mine owner in Charters Towers.
 
Sayers was elected in 1888 to the Legislative Assembly of Queensland as the member for Charters Towers, serving until 1893. In 1906, he was elected to the Australian Senate as an Anti-Socialist Senator for Queensland, joining the Commonwealth Liberal Party in 1909. He was defeated in 1913.

Sayers died in 1919, aged 74, and was buried in Brisbane's Toowong Cemetery.

References

Free Trade Party members of the Parliament of Australia
Commonwealth Liberal Party members of the Parliament of Australia
Members of the Australian Senate for Queensland
Members of the Australian Senate
1845 births
1919 deaths
20th-century Australian politicians
People from Cowes
English emigrants to Australia
Australian miners
Members of the Queensland Legislative Assembly